Erich Köchermann (21 May 1904 – 21 July 1964) was a German athlete. He competed in the men's long jump at the 1928 Summer Olympics and the 1932 Summer Olympics.

References

1904 births
1964 deaths
Athletes (track and field) at the 1928 Summer Olympics
Athletes (track and field) at the 1932 Summer Olympics
German male long jumpers
Olympic athletes of Germany
Place of birth missing